Events from the year 1962 in Sweden

Incumbents
 Monarch – Gustaf VI Adolf 
 Prime Minister – Tage Erlander

Events

Births
 6 March – Bengt Baron, swimmer.
 21 September – Peter Åslin, ice hockey player (died 2012).
 26 September – Jonas Bergqvist, ice hockey player.

Deaths

 5 January – Per Thorén, figure skater (born 1885)
 22 January – Carl-Ehrenfried Carlberg, gymnast (born 1889).
 18 February – Erik Granfelt, gymnast (born 1883).
 5 April – Boo Kullberg, gymnast (born 1889).
 11 April – Sven Landberg, gymnast (born 1888).
 4 July – Carl Hellström, sailor (born 1864).
 7 August – Gustaf Lewenhaupt, count, military officer and horse rider (born 1879).
 19 August – Kerstin Hesselgren, politician (born 1872

References

 
Sweden
Years of the 20th century in Sweden